Rize–Artvin Airport is an airport off the coast of in Rize Province, northeastern Türkiye.

Overview
It opened for commercial business on 14 May 2022, with Turkish Airlines, soon followed on the same day with AnadoluJet. On 3 July 2022, Pegasus Airlines also began operating to the airport. 

The airport is situated off the coast of Yeşilköy village in Pazar district of Rize Province. It was constructed on ground obtained through filling a part of the Black Sea shore by rocks brought from nearby quarries in Merdivenli, Hisarlı, Kanlımezra and Kuzeyce. To fill the up to -deep sea, at least 85 million tons of rock is required. The construction works began with groundbreaking in 2017. It is the country's second airport of its sort following Ordu–Giresun Airport. It is expected that the airport will serve about two million passengers annually. The construction cost was budgeted to 750 million (approx. US$206 million).

Airlines and destinations

Geography and Transport 
Airport is close to Yeşilköy, Sivrikale, Sulak, Hisarlı, Subaşı, Darılı, Aktaş, Akmescit, Balıkçı, Aktepe, Alçılı, Merdivenli, Güney, Kesikköprü, Örnek, Kuzayca, Tütüncüler, Yemişli, Hasköy, Topluca, Tektaş, Sahilköy, Şendere, Kemerköy, Elmalık, Papatya, Boğazlı, Sessizdere, Derebaşı, Yücehisar, Irmakköy, Kestanelik, Hamidiye, Çınartepe, Zafer, Dernek, Sivritepe, Suçatı, Ortaırmak, Kaçkar, Derinsu, Erenler, Şentepe, Sefalı, Yavuzlar, Çilingir, Irmakyeniköy, Ortayol, Başköy, Düzgeçit, Aşıklar, Beyazkaya, Leventköy, Handağı, Abdullahhoca, Yeşilırmak, Yaltkaya, Şehitlik, Yamaçdere, Uğrak, Selimiye, Akbucak, Zeytinlik, Esendağ, Çıraklar, Erdemli, Yamaçköy, Pirinçlik, Latifli, Kayağantaş, Sarısu, Yavuz, Yanıkdağ, and Köprübaşı villages; Madenli town; Pazar, Ardeşen, Çayeli, Hemşin, and Çamlıhemşin district centers.

The routes from the airport to nearby cities are these:

To Artvin (Based on the Artvin Çoruh University.)

 (111 km., 107 min.) D010 (Pazar direction) - Pazar - D010 (Ardeşen direction) - Ardeşen - D010 (Fındıklı direction) - Fındıklı - D010 (Arhavi direction) - Arhavi - D010 (Hopa direction) - Hopa - D010 (Borçka direction) - Borçka - D010 (Şavşat direction) - 08-06 (university direction)

To Rize (Based on the Recep Tayyip Erdoğan University.)

 (34 km., 39 min.) D010 (Çayeli direction) - Çayeli - D010 (Rize direction) - Menderes Boulevard By-street

References

Airports in Turkey
Buildings and structures in Rize Province
Artificial island airports
Transport in Rize Province
Transport in Artvin Province
Pazar, Rize
Airports established in 2022
2022 establishments in Turkey